General Khan Mohammad "Mujahid" (1961 - 15 April 2011) was a senior policeman in Afghanistan. He was killed by a suicide bomber in 2011.

He was born in 1961 in Arghandab District near Kandahar, a member of the Alokozay tribe. He fought against the Soviet occupation of Afghanistan and against the Taliban. He became chief of police in Ghazni and moved in 2009 to Kandahar where he was responsible for the policing of the south of Kandahar Province.

On 15 April 2011 he was killed in a suicide bombing at the Kandahar police headquarters. The Taliban claimed responsibility for his murder.

References 

Politicians of Kandahar Province
People of the Soviet–Afghan War
Pashtun people
National Islamic Front of Afghanistan politicians
Afghan military personnel
Afghan government officials
Afghan military officers
1961 births
2011 deaths